The 2015 FIL World Luge Championships took place under the auspices of the International Luge Federation at the Sigulda bobsleigh, luge, and skeleton track in Sigulda, Latvia from 14–15 February 2015.

Schedule
Four events were held.

Medal summary

Medal table

Medalists

References

External links
Official website

 
2015
FIL World Luge Championships
FIL World Luge Championships
2015 FIL World Luge Championships
Luge in Latvia